The following is a list of episodes of the family television anthology Faerie Tale Theatre, also known as Shelley Duvall's Faerie Tale Theatre which ran on Showtime from 1982 to 1987, airing a total 27 episodes.

The series featured numerous famous Hollywood actors (particularly of the period), with Robin Williams and Teri Garr in the first episode, "The Tale of the Frog Prince". Creator and executive producer Shelley Duvall appeared in 3 episodes and narrated 3 episodes. John Achorn is credited in 11 character roles, while others, including Jean Stapleton, Mark Blankfield, Charlie Dell, Donovan Scott, and Dan Frischman, are credited in more than three episodes.

Series overview

Episodes

Season 1 (1982)

Season 2 (1983)

Season 3 (1984)

Season 4 (1985)

Season 5 (1986)

Season 6 (1987)

External links 
 
 

Faerie Tale Theatre
Lists of anthology television series episodes